Richard Wrottesley may refer to:
 Richard John Wrottesley, 5th Baron Wrottesley, British peer and army officer
 Sir Richard Wrottesley, 7th Baronet, member of parliament and Anglican clergyman